Mount Ascutney State Park is a state park in the U.S. state of Vermont. The park entrance is located along Vermont Route 44-A near the town of Windsor in Windsor County. Operated by the Vermont Department of Forests, Parks and Recreation, a significant portion of the park is listed on the National Register of Historic Places.

Description
Four of these trails—the Futures Trail, the Weathersfield Trail, the Brownsville Trail, and the Windsor Trail—lead to the summit of Mount Ascutney, the park's most significant feature. On the parkway, grades average 10% with some sections as steep at 19%.

In 2016, the state designated the Cascade Falls Natural Area in the southwest corner of the park. The Weathersfield Trail, named after the nearby town of Weathersfield, Vermont, traverses the  natural area on its way to the summit of Mount Ascutney. The trail passes by Cascade Falls, an  waterfall on Ascutney Brook.

History
Mount Ascutney State Park was founded in the 1930s by the state with funding provided by New Deal-era federal government funding. The CCC crew was responsible for construction of the parkway to the summit area, campground and picnic areas, and other amenities. The company assigned to the park was relocated to Ludlow in 1938. The area where the CCC camp was located is now part of the main campground; no buildings survive.   of the park were listed on the National Register of Historic Places in 2002 in recognition of its CCC legacy.

References

State parks of Vermont
Protected areas of Windsor County, Vermont
Windsor, Vermont
National Register of Historic Places in Windsor County, Vermont